San Marcos Arteaga is a town and municipality in Oaxaca in south-western Mexico. The municipality covers an area of 133.96 km². 
It is part of the Huajuapan District in the north of the Mixteca Region.

As of 2005, the municipality had a total population of 2110.

References

Municipalities of Oaxaca